The Literature, Publishing & Translation Commission (LPT) is a governmental commission established in February 2020 based in Riyadh. The commission's main purpose is to systemize the publishing industry, develops a creative environment and create investment opportunities.

History 
In 2019, the minister of culture prince Badr bin Abdullah announced the establishment of 27 initiatives under 16 newly established authorities that the ministry of culture will take. The initiatives include the establishment of King Salman Global Arabic Language Complex, Nomow Cultural Fund, Culture Scholarship Program, improving public libraries, having the Red Sea International Film Festival and more.

References 

Ministry of Culture (Saudi Arabia)
2020 in Saudi Arabia
2020 establishments in Saudi Arabia
Government of Saudi Arabia